The Kannada Filmfare Best Film Award is given by the Filmfare magazine as part of its annual Filmfare Awards for Kannada films.

Here is a list of the award winners and the films for which they won.

References

Filmfare Awards South (Kannada)